Regional elections were held in some regions of Italy during 1963. These included:

Sicily on 9 June
Aosta Valley on 27 October

Elections in Italian regions
1963 elections in Italy